Colégio de Gaia/Toyota  is a women's handball club from Vila Nova de Gaia in Portugal. Colégio de Gaia competes in the 1ª Divisão.

European record

Team

Current squad 

Squad for the 2016–17 season

Goalkeepers
 Bruna Cerqueira
 Ana Catarina Ferreira 
 Jessica Ferreira
 Daniela Pereira
 Maria Rocha

Wingers
RW
  Sofia Jesus
  Catarina Mendes
  Bebiana Rodrigues Sabino
LW 
  Slavia Joao
  Carolina Monteiro
  Helena Soares

Back players
LB
  Melissa Costa
  Carolina Loureiro
  Joana Pinto
  Patricia Resende
  Sandra Santiago
CB 
  Patricia da Silva Lima
  Maria Duarte 
RB
  Sara Costa
  Ana Gante
  Rosa Nolasco
  Nair Pinho
  Catarina Ruela
  Vanessa Silva

External links

 
 EHF Club profile

Portuguese handball clubs
Sport in Vila Nova de Gaia